Árpád Soltész (born November 16, 1944) is a Hungarian sprint canoeist who competed in the 1960s. He won two bronze medals in the C-2 1000 m event at the ICF Canoe Sprint World Championships (1963, 1966).

Soltész also finished fourth in the C-2 1000 m event at the 1964 Summer Olympics in Tokyo.

References

Sports-reference.com profile

1944 births
Canoeists at the 1964 Summer Olympics
Hungarian male canoeists
Living people
Olympic canoeists of Hungary
ICF Canoe Sprint World Championships medalists in Canadian
20th-century Hungarian people